The Cleveland metropolitan area, or Greater Cleveland as it is more commonly known, is the metropolitan area surrounding the city of Cleveland in Northeast Ohio, United States. According to the 2020 United States Census results, the five-county Cleveland–Elyria Metropolitan Statistical Area (MSA) consists of Cuyahoga County, Geauga County, Lake County, Lorain County, and Medina County, and has a population of 2,088,251, making it the 34th most populous metropolitan area in the United States, and the third largest metropolitan area in Ohio. The metro area is also part of the larger Cleveland–Akron–Canton Combined Statistical Area with a population of over 3.6 million people, the most populous statistical area in Ohio and the 17th most populous in the United States.

Northeast Ohio refers to a similar but substantially larger region that is home to over 4.5 million residents that also includes areas not part of Greater Cleveland. This article covers the area considered to be Greater Cleveland, but includes some information generally applicable to the larger region, which is itself part of what is known historically as the Connecticut Western Reserve.

Northeast Ohio

Northeast Ohio consists of 16 counties (Ashland, Ashtabula, Carroll, Columbiana, Cuyahoga, Geauga, Lake, Lorain, Mahoning, Medina, Portage, Richland, Stark, Summit, Trumbull and Wayne counties) and includes the cities of Akron, Ashland, Ashtabula, Brunswick, Canton, Cleveland, Elyria, Lorain, Mansfield, Medina, Wadsworth, Wooster, Warren, and Youngstown. Northeast Ohio is home to approximately 4 million people, has a labor force of almost 2 million, and a gross regional product of nearly $170 billion. Other counties are sometimes considered to be in Northeast Ohio. These include Erie, Holmes, Huron and Tuscarawas counties, and their inclusion makes the total population of the entire northeastern section of Ohio well over 4.5 million people.

Cities, townships, and villages

Cuyahoga County

Bay Village
Beachwood
Bedford
Bedford Heights
Bentleyville
Berea
Bratenahl
Brecksville
Broadview Heights
Brook Park
Brooklyn
Brooklyn Heights
Chagrin Falls
Chagrin Falls Township
Cleveland
Cleveland Heights
Cuyahoga Heights
East Cleveland
Euclid
Fairview Park
Garfield Heights
Gates Mills
Glenwillow
Highland Heights
Highland Hills
Hunting Valley
Independence
Lakewood
Linndale
Lyndhurst
Maple Heights
Mayfield Heights
Mayfield Village
Middleburg Heights
Moreland Hills
Newburgh Heights
North Olmsted
North Randall
North Royalton
Oakwood Village
Olmsted Falls
Olmsted Township
Orange
Parma
Parma Heights
Pepper Pike
Richmond Heights
Rocky River
Seven Hills
Shaker Heights
Solon
South Euclid
Strongsville
University Heights
Valley View
Walton Hills
Warrensville Heights
Westlake
Woodmere

Geauga County

Aquilla
Auburn Township
Bainbridge Township
Burton
Burton Township
Chardon
Chardon Township
Chester
Chesterland
Claridon Township
Hambden Township
Hunting Valley (part)
Huntsburg Township
Middlefield
Middlefield Township
Montville Township
Munson Township
Newbury Township
Parkman Township
Russell Township
South Russell
Thompson Township
Troy Township

Lake County

Concord Township
Eastlake
Fairport Harbor
Grand River
Kirtland
Kirtland Hills
Lakeline
LeRoy Township
Madison
Madison Township
Mentor
Mentor-on-the-Lake
North Madison
North Perry
Painesville
Painesville Township
Perry
Perry Township
Timberlake
Waite Hill
Wickliffe
Willoughby
Willoughby Hills
Willowick

Lorain County

Amherst
Amherst Township
Avon
Avon Lake
Brighton Township
Brownhelm Township
Camden Township
Carlisle Township
Columbia Township
Eaton Estates
Eaton Township
Elyria
Elyria Township
Grafton
Grafton Township
Henrietta Township
Huntington Township
Kipton
Lagrange
LaGrange Township
Lorain
New Russia Township
North Ridgeville
Oberlin
Penfield Township
Pittsfield Township
Rochester
Rochester Township
Sheffield
Sheffield Lake
Sheffield Township
South Amherst
Vermilion (portions in Erie and Lorain Counties)
Wellington
Wellington Township

Medina County

Brunswick
Brunswick Hills Township
Chatham Township
Chippewa Lake
Creston
Gloria Glens Park
Granger Township
Guilford Township
Harrisville Township
Hinckley Township
Homer Township
Lafayette Township
Litchfield Township
Liverpool Township
Lodi
Medina
Medina Township
Montville Township
Rittman
Seville
Sharon Township
Spencer
Spencer Township
Wadsworth
Wadsworth Township
Westfield Center
Westfield Township
York Township

Cities by population
These, in decreasing order of population, are the twelve largest cities in Greater Cleveland of (2020):

Demographics

According to the 2010 United States Census, the population was 2.077 million in the five-county MSA of the Greater Cleveland Area, making it the second largest metropolitan-statistical area entirely within the state of Ohio. Approximately 48.1% of the population was male and 51.9% were female. In 2010 the racial makeup of the five-county Area was 71.7% (1,490,074) Non-Hispanic Whites, 19.7% (409,582) Blacks or African Americans, 0.2% (4,056) American Indians and Alaskan Natives, 2.0% (40,522) Asian (0.7% Asian Indian 0.5% Chinese 0.2% Filipino, 0.1% Korean, 0.1% Vietnamese, 0.1% Japanese, 0.0% (398) Pacific Islander, 1.7% (35,224) from other races, and 2.0% (42,130) from two or more races. 4.7% (98,133) of the population were Hispanic or Latino of any race (2.8% Puerto Rican, 1.0% Mexican, 0.1% Dominican, and 0.1% Cuban).

The median income for a household in Greater Cleveland was $46,231 and the median income for a family, $59,611. The per capita income was $25,668. Persons living below the poverty line was 15.1%. According to a study by Capgemini and the World Wealth Report by Merrill Lynch, the Cleveland area has nearly 54,000 millionaire households, and is expected to continue to grow at 17% over the next five years.

The Greater Cleveland area is the most diverse region in the state of Ohio and is becoming increasingly more diverse with new waves of immigration. As of 2010, both the Hispanic and Asian population in the Cleveland-Akron-Ashtabula area grew by almost 40%, Hispanics now number at 112,307 (up from 80,738 in 2000). The Asian population alone accounts for 55,087 (up from 39,586 in 2000) but people who cite Asian and other ethnicities enumerate 67,231. The Chinese Americans are the oldest Asian group residing in Northeast Ohio, most visible in Cleveland's Asiatown. Nevertheless, the area is also home to hundreds of Indians, Thais, Taiwanese, Pakistanis, Laotians, Cambodians, and Burmese peoples as well.

The Cleveland area has a substantial African American population with origins in the First and Second Great Migrations. It also boasts some of the nation's largest Irish, Italian (numbering over 205,000), Slavic, and Hungarian populations. At one time, the Hungarian population of Cleveland proper was so great that the city boasted of having the highest concentration of Hungarians in the world outside of Budapest. Today, the Greater Cleveland area is home to the largest Slovak, Slovene, and Hungarian communities in the world, outside of Slovakia, Slovenia, and Hungary respectively. The Slavic population of the Cleveland-Akron area comprises 17.2%, far higher than the nation's rate of 6%. There are 171,000 Poles, 38,000 Slovaks, 66,000 Slovenes, 38,000 Czechs, 31,000 Russians, and 23,000 Ukrainians in Greater Cleveland. Slavic Village and Tremont historically had some of the largest concentrations of Eastern Europeans within Cleveland proper. Today, both neighborhoods continue to be home to many Slavic Ohioans.  In addition, Slovenia maintains a Consulate-General in Downtown Cleveland. The city of Cleveland has also received visits from the Presidents of Hungary and Poland.

Greater Cleveland is home to a sizable Jewish community. According to the North American Jewish Data Bank, the community comprises an estimated 86,600 people or 3.0% as of 2011, above the nation's 1.7%, and up from 81,500 in 1996. The highest proportion is in Cuyahoga County at 5.5% (of the county's total population). Today, 23% of Greater Cleveland's Jewish population is under the age of 17, and 27% reside in the Heights area (Cleveland Heights, Shaker Heights, and University Heights). In 2010 nearly 2,600 people spoke Hebrew and 1,100 Yiddish.

Ancestry
The top largest ancestries in the Greater Cleveland MSA, were the following:

German: 20.4%
Slavic: 18.9% (8.2% Polish, 3.2% Slovak, 1.8% Slovene, 1.5% Czech, 1.5% Russian, 1.1% Ukrainian, 1.0% Croatian, 0.4% Serbian, Rusyn, Yugoslav)
Irish: 14.5%
British: 11.3% (8.0% English, 1.8% Scottish, 0.8% Scot-Irish, 0.7% Welsh)
Italian: 9.9%
Hungarian: 3.7%
Puerto Rican: 2.8%
French and French Canadian: 1.9%
Scandinavian: 1.2% (0.7% Swedish, 0.3% Norwegian, and Danish)
Arab: 1.0%

Place of birth
Approximately 94.1% of the metropolitan area's population was native to the United States. Approximately 92.8% were born in the U.S. while 1.3% were born in Puerto Rico, a U.S. territory, or born abroad to American parents. The rest of the population (5.9%) were foreign-born. The highest percentages of immigrants came from Europe (46.2%), Asia (32.7%), Latin America (14.3%); smaller percentages of newcomers came from Africa (3.6%), other parts of North America (3.0%), and Oceania (0.3%).

According to the American Community Survey 2006-2010, the number of Greater Cleveland area residents born overseas was 119,136 and the leading countries of origin were India (10,067), China (7,756), Mexico (6,051), Ukraine (7,211), Germany (5,742), Italy (4,114), Canada (4,102), United Kingdom (4,048), Romania (3,947), Poland (3,834), Russia (3,826), and Yugoslavia (3,820).

Language spoken at home
English is by far the most commonly spoken language at home by residents in the Cleveland-Akron-Elyria area; approximately 91.2% of the population over the age of five spoke only English at home. Spanish speakers made up 2.8% of the population; speakers of Asian languages made up 1.1% of the population; speakers of other Indo-European languages made up 3.9% of the population. Individuals who spoke languages other than the ones above represented the remaining 1.0% of the populace. As of 2011, individually in addition to English, 2.7% spoke Spanish, 0.6% German, 0.5% Arabic, and 0.5% Chinese. 1.4% also spoke a Slavic language. In 2007, Cleveland area was home to the nation's 3rd highest proportion of Hungarian speakers.

Area codes
In the 1950s, AT&T assigned Greater Cleveland Area code 216, which included all of Northeast Ohio. In 1996, Area code 216 was reduced in size to cover the northern half of its prior area, centering on Cleveland and its lake shore suburbs. Area code 330 was introduced for the southern half of Greater Cleveland, including Medina County. The western half of the region, including Ashland and Richland counties, and parts of Huron, Wayne, and Erie counties, are assigned area codes 419 and 567.

In 1997, area code 216 was further split as the need for additional phone numbers grew. Area code 216 was reduced in geographical area to cover the city of Cleveland and its inner ring suburbs. Area code 440 was introduced to cover the remainder of was what previously area code 216, including all of Lorain, Geauga, and Lake counties, and parts of Cuyahoga County. Some communities, such as Parma, and Parma Heights were divided between the 216 and 440 area codes. In 1999, Congressman Dennis Kucinich introduced federal legislation to protect small and medium-sized cities from being split into two or more area codes.

In 2000, it was anticipated that the available phone numbers in area code 330 would be exhausted, and an overlay area code was introduced. Area code 234 was assigned to overlap existing area code 330. With the creation of area code 234, any new phone number in the geographical area formerly covered by area code 330 could be assigned a phone number in either the 234 or 330 area codes, with no change in local or long distance toll status. This made necessary the use of ten-digit dialing within the 330/234 area code region. After the introduction of area code 234, assignments of new telephone numbers in the area did not continue at an accelerated pace, and new phone numbers for area code 234 were not assigned until 2003.

Economy

In 2011 the Greater Cleveland area had a GDP of $134.4 billion (up from $130.7 billion in 2008), which would rank 57th among countries. Cleveland also has the twelfth highest merchandise value at $109.2 billion.

Business and industry
More than 37% of Fortune 500 companies are present in Northeast Ohio, through corporate headquarters, major divisions, subsidiaries, and sales offices. In addition, more than 150 international companies have a presence there. , Northeast Ohio serves as the corporate headquarters of 22 Fortune 1000 firms (shown with 2017 rankings below):
 (#86) Progressive Insurance (Mayfield Village, insurance)
 (#180) Sherwin-Williams (Cleveland, paint)
 (#216) Goodyear Tire and Rubber Company (Akron, rubber)
 (#224) Parker-Hannifin (Cleveland, industrial manufacturer)
 (#294) FirstEnergy (Akron, utilities)
 (#407) J.M. Smucker Company (Orrville, food consumer products)
 (#411) KeyCorp (Cleveland, banking)
 (#467) Cliffs Natural Resources (Cleveland, iron ore mining)/AK Steel Holdings/Mittal
 (#480) Travel Centers of America (Westlake, specialty retail)
 (#508) RPM International (Medina, chemicals)
 (#513) TransDigm Group (Cleveland, aerospace and defense)
 (#607) Diebold (North Canton, electronics)
 (#724) PolyOne Corporation (Avon Lake, chemicals)
 (#762) Medical Mutual of Ohio (Cleveland, health insurance)
 (#781) The Timken Company (North Canton, specialty steel)
 (#782) Aleris International, Inc. (Cleveland, metals)
 (#783) Lincoln Electric (Cleveland, arc welding equipment)
 (#792) Hyster-Yale Materials Handling (Cleveland, industrial machinery)
 (#806) Applied Industrial Technologies (Cleveland, bearings)
 (#811) A. Schulman (Fairlawn, chemicals)
 (#965) American Greetings (Cleveland, greeting cards)
 (#996) Nordson (Westlake, industrial machinery)

Other large employers include:
 Agilysis (Mayfield Heights, electronics)
 Babcock & Wilcox (Barberton, engineering)
 Cafaro Corp (Youngstown, mall management and properties)
 Cleveland Clinic (Cleveland, health care)
 DeBartolo-York Corp (Boardman Township, Youngstown, mall management and properties)
 Eaton Corporation (North American HQ - Beachwood, electrical parts manufacturing)
 Exal Corp Aluminum Production (Youngstown, metals)
 Ferro Corporation (Cleveland, advanced material manufacturing)
 Forest City Enterprises (Cleveland, real estate development)
 Gojo (Akron, chemicals)
 Home Savings and Loan (Youngstown, banking)
 IMG (Cleveland, sports marketing and management)
 Invacare (Elyria, medical products and equipment)
 Jo Ann Stores (Hudson, specialty retailer)
 Jones Day (Cleveland, legal services)
 Lubrizol Corporation (Wickliffe, lubricants and chemicals)
 Mayfran International (Cleveland, conveyors)
 Nacco Industries (Cleveland, industrial equipment)
 Nestlé USA (Solon, food processing)
 Roadway Express (Akron, logistics)
 Rockwell Automation (Mayfield Heights, industrial controls)
 SITE Centers (Beachwood, real estate development)
 Summa Health System (Akron, health care)
 University Hospitals of Cleveland (Cleveland, health care)

Small businesses and startups

The Council of Smaller Enterprises coordinates and advocates for small businesses in the region. Many of the area's sustainability-oriented companies are tied into the network Entrepreneurs for Sustainability.

Colleges and universities 
Greater Cleveland is home to a number of higher education institutions, including:
Baldwin Wallace University (Berea)
Case Western Reserve University (Cleveland)
Chamberlain School of Nursing (Cleveland)
Cleveland Institute of Art (Cleveland)
Cleveland Institute of Music (Cleveland)
Cleveland State University (Cleveland)
Cuyahoga Community College (Cleveland, Highland Hills, and Parma)
DeVry University (Seven Hills)
John Carroll University (University Heights)
Kent State University at Geauga (Burton)
Kent State University College of Podiatric Medicine (Independence)
Lake Erie College (Painesville)
Lakeland Community College (Kirtland)
Lorain County Community College (Elyria)
Notre Dame College (South Euclid)
Oberlin College (Oberlin)
South University (Warrensville Heights, Ohio)
Stautzenberger College (Brecksville)
Ursuline College (Pepper Pike)

Transportation

Airports 
Greater Cleveland is served by international, regional and county airports, including:
 Burke Lakefront Airport (Cleveland)
 Concord Airpark Airport (Concord Township)
 Cuyahoga County Airport
 Cleveland Hopkins International Airport (Cleveland)
 Lorain County Regional Airport (Russia Township)
 Willoughby Lost Nation Municipal Airport (Willoughby)

Highways 

 Interstate 71
 Interstate 77
  Interstate 80 (Ohio Turnpike)
 Interstate 90
 Interstate 271
 Interstate 277
 Interstate 480
 Interstate 490
 U.S. Route 6
 U.S. Route 20
 U.S. Route 42
 U.S. Route 224
 U.S. Route 250
 U.S. Route 322
 U.S. Route 422
 Ohio State Route 2
 Ohio State Route 3
 Ohio State Route 8
 Ohio State Route 10
 Ohio State Route 11
 Ohio State Route 14
 Ohio State Route 17
 Ohio State Route 18
 Ohio State Route 21
 Ohio State Route 43
 Ohio State Route 44
 Ohio State Route 83
 Ohio State Route 88
 Ohio State Route 91
 Ohio State Route 113
 Ohio State Route 175
 Ohio State Route 176
 Ohio State Route 225
 Ohio State Route 254
 Ohio State Route 700
 Ohio State Route 711

Highway notes 
 I-271 and I-480 were the only two auxiliary Interstates in the nation that ran concurrently with each other for any distance until 2022, when a concurrency between I-587 and I-795 in North Carolina was established with the designation of I-587.

Public transit 
The Greater Cleveland Regional Transit Authority operates a bus system and heavy and light rail in Cuyahoga County. Other transit agencies serve the surrounding counties and provide connections with RTA, including Laketran in Lake County, and Lorain County Transit in Lorain County. Cleveland's RTA Red Line which started in 1955, is the eighth oldest heavy rail rapid transit in the Country In 2007, RTA was named the best public transit system in North America by the American Public Transportation Association, for "demonstrating achievement in efficiency and effectiveness."

Culture

Theater

Playhouse Square Center is the epicenter of the Cleveland Theater District and the second largest theater district in the United States.

Playhouse Square Theaters
Allen Theatre
Hanna Theatre
Ohio Theatre
State Theatre
Palace Theatre
Kennedy's Cabaret
Second Stage 
The Helen Rosenfeld Lewis Bialosky Lab Theatre
Westfield Insurance Studio Theatre

In addition, Greater Cleveland has additional theaters throughout the region.

Theaters 
 Beck Center (Lakewood)
 Cabaret Dada (Cleveland)
 Cassidy Theater (Parma Heights)
 Cleveland Play House (Cleveland)
 Cleveland Public Theater (Cleveland)
 Dobama Theater (Cleveland Heights)
 Euclid Avenue Opera House (destroyed)
 Lorain Palace Theatre (Lorain)
 Geauga Lyric Theater (Chardon)
 Huntington Playhouse (Bay Village)
 Karamu House (Cleveland)
 Near West Theatre (Cleveland)
 Olde Towne Hall Theatre (North Ridgeville)

Theatrical companies 
 The Bang and Clatter Theatre Company
 Beck Center for the Arts
 Bodwin Theater Company
 Charenton Theatre Company
 Cleveland Shakespeare Festival
 Cleveland Signstage Theatre
 Convergence-Continuum
 Fairmount Center for the Arts (Mayfield Village Performing Arts Center)
 Fourth Wall Productions
 Great Lakes Theater Festival
 The Group
 Portage Lakes Players
 The Public Squares
 Red Hen Productions

Music 
Cleveland is home to the Cleveland Orchestra, widely considered one of the finest orchestras in the world, and often referred to as the finest in the United States. It is one of the "Big Five" major orchestras in the United States. The Orchestra plays at Severance Hall in University Circle during the winter and at Blossom Music Center in Cuyahoga Falls during the summer. The city is also home to the Cleveland Pops Orchestra.

Art 
There are two main art museums in Cleveland. The Cleveland Museum of Art is a major American art museum, with a collection that includes more than 40,000 works of art ranging over 6,000 years, from ancient masterpieces to contemporary pieces. Museum of Contemporary Art Cleveland showcases established and emerging artists, particularly from the Cleveland area, through hosting and producing temporary exhibitions.

Sports and recreation

Cleveland's professional sports teams include the Cleveland Guardians (Major League Baseball), Cleveland Browns (National Football League), and Cleveland Cavaliers (National Basketball Association). The Lake County Captains, a Single-A minor league affiliate of the Cleveland Guardians, play in Eastlake at Classic Park. Additionally, the Lake Erie Crushers of the Frontier League play at Sprenger Stadium in Avon.

Minor league hockey is represented in the area by the Cleveland Monsters of the American Hockey League. They began play in the 2007–08 AHL season at the Quicken Loans Arena. The team is the top minor league affiliate of the Columbus Blue Jackets of the National Hockey League.

The Cleveland Metroparks are a system of nature preserves that encircle the city, and the Cuyahoga Valley National Park encompasses the Cuyahoga River valley between Cleveland and Akron. The region is home to Mentor Headlands Beach, the longest natural beach on the Great Lakes.

Notable natives

Avant
Albert Ayler
Jim Backus
Kaye Ballard
LeCharles Bentley
Halle Berry
Chris Butler
Eric Carmen
Drew Carey
Mary Carey
Ray Cash
Drew Carter
Machine Gun Kelly
Gerald Casale
Chris Chambers
Tracy Chapman
Cheetah Chrome
Tim Conway
Wes Craven
Kid Cudi
Dorothy Dandridge
Cheri Dennis
Ruby Dee
Donald DeFreeze
Phil Donahue
Stephen R. Donaldson
Harlan Ellison
Lee Evans
James A. Garfield
Sonny Geraci
Donald A. Glaser
Ted Ginn Jr.
Bob Golic
Mike Golic
Anthony Gonzalez
Jim Graner
Joel Grey
Arsenio Hall
Roy Hall
Margaret Hamilton
Steve Harvey
Patricia Heaton
Anne Heche
Mike Hegan
John W. Heisman
Kim Herring
Hal Holbrook
Bob Hope
Langston Hughes
Chrissie Hynde
LeBron James
Philip Johnson
Joe Jurevicius
Sammy Kaye
Don King
Bobby Knight
Heather Kozar
Dennis Kucinich
Dante Lavelli
Mike Lebowitz
Gerald Levert
D. A. Levy
Bob Lewis
Peter B. Lewis
Jim Lovell
Henry Mancini
Scott Mescudi
Howard Metzenbaum
O.J. McDuffie
Burgess Meredith
Toni Morrison
Bob Mothersbaugh
Mark Mothersbaugh
Paul Newman
Urban Meyer
Chuck Noll
Andre Norton
Charles Oakley
Jesse Owens
Harvey Pekar
Scott Raab
Dave Ragone
John D. Rockefeller
Michael Ruhlman
Screamin' Jay Hawkins
Molly Shannon
Sam Sheppard
Don Shula
Jerry Siegel
Robert Smith
Troy Smith
Ruth Simpson
Steve Stone
George Steinbrenner
Carl B. Stokes
Michael Symon
David Thomas
Jim Tressel
George Voinovich
David Wain
Carl E. Walz
Lew Wasserman
Debra Winger
Archibald Willard
Fred Willard
Frank Yankovic
Roger Zelazny
Stephen Curry

See also

 Connecticut Western Reserve
 Great Lakes Megalopolis
 Great lakes region
 Rust Belt
 List of references to Cleveland in popular culture
 List of United States combined statistical areas
 List of United States metropolitan statistical areas by population

References

External links

Northern Ohio Data & Information Service
Encyclopedia of Cleveland History

 
 
Metropolitan areas of Ohio
Regions of Ohio
Ohio populated places on Lake Erie